Destroyer escort (DE) was the United States Navy mid-20th-century classification for a  warship designed with the endurance necessary to escort mid-ocean convoys of merchant marine ships.

Development of the destroyer escort was promoted by the British need in World War II for anti-submarine ships that could operate in open oceans at speeds of up to 20 knots. These "British Destroyer Escort"s were designed by the US for mass-production under Lend Lease as a less expensive alternative to fleet destroyers.

The Royal Navy and Commonwealth forces identified such warships as frigates, and that classification was widely accepted when the United States redesignated destroyer escorts as frigates (FF) in 1975. From circa 1954 until 1975 new-build US Navy ships designated as destroyer escorts (DE) were called ocean escorts. Similar types of warships in other navies of the time included the 46 diesel-engined Kaibōkan of the Imperial Japanese Navy, 10 Kriegsmarine F-class escort ships, and the two Amiral Murgescu-class vessels of the Romanian Navy.

Postwar destroyer escorts and frigates were larger than those produced during wartime, with increased anti-aircraft capability, but remained smaller and slower than postwar destroyers. As Cold War destroyer escorts became as large as wartime destroyers, the United States Navy converted some of their World War II destroyers to escort destroyers (DDE).

General description

Full-sized destroyers must be able to steam as fast or faster than fast capital ships such as fleet carriers and cruisers. They must carry torpedoes and a smaller caliber of cannon to use against enemy ships, as well as antisubmarine detection equipment and weapons.

A destroyer escort needed only to be able to maneuver relative to a slow convoy (which in World War II would travel at ), be able to defend against aircraft, and detect, pursue, and attack submarines. These lower requirements greatly reduce the size, cost, and crew required for the destroyer escort. Destroyer escorts were optimized for antisubmarine warfare, having a tighter turning radius and more specialized armament (such as the forward-firing Hedgehog mortar) than fleet destroyers.

As an alternative to geared steam-turbine propulsion found in full-sized destroyers and larger warships, many US destroyer escorts of the World War II period had diesel-electric or turboelectric drive, in which the engine rooms functioned as power stations supplying current to electric motors sited close to the propellers. Electric drive was selected because it does not need gearboxes (which were heavily in demand for the fast fleet destroyers) to adjust engine speed to the much lower optimal speed for the propellers. The current from the engine room can be used equally well for other purposes, and after the war, many destroyer escorts were re-used as floating power stations for coastal cities in Latin America under programs funded by the World Bank..  ships were the exception to this and they used a geared diesel engine to drive the propellers directly. s used the typical boiler and geared turbine propulsion system.

The Tacoma-class patrol frigates (PF) had a greater range than the superficially similar destroyer escorts, but the US Navy viewed them as decidedly inferior in all other respects. The Tacoma class had a much larger turning circle than a destroyer escort, lacked sufficient ventilation for warm-weather operations – a reflection of their original British design and its emphasis on operations in the North Atlantic Ocean – and were criticized as far too hot below decks, and, because of the mercantile style of their hulls, had far less resistance to underwater explosions than ships built to naval standards like the destroyer escorts.

Destroyer escorts were also useful for coastal antisubmarine and radar picket ship duty. During World War II, seven destroyer escorts (DEs) were converted to radar picket destroyer escorts (DERs), supplementing radar picket destroyers. Although these were relegated to secondary roles after the war, in the mid-1950s, 12 more DEs were converted to DERs, serving as such until 1960–1965. Their mission was to extend the Distant Early Warning Line on both coasts, in conjunction with 16 s, which were converted Liberty ships.

During World War II, some 95 destroyer escorts were converted by the US to high-speed transports (APDs). This involved adding an extra deck which allowed space for about 10 officers and 150 men. Two large davits were also installed, one on either side of the ship, from which landing craft (LCVPs) could be launched.

Origins

The Lend-Lease Act was passed into law in the United States in March 1941, enabling the United Kingdom to procure merchant ships, warships, munitions, and other materiel from the US, to help with the war effort. This enabled the UK to commission the US to design, build, and supply an escort vessel that was suitable for antisubmarine warfare in deep open-ocean situations, which they did in June 1941. Captain E.L. Cochrane of the American Bureau of Shipping came up with a design which was known as the British destroyer escort (BDE). The BDE designation was retained by the first six destroyer escorts transferred to the United Kingdom (BDE 1, 2, 3, 4, 12, and 46); of the initial order of 50, these were the only ones the Royal Navy received, the rest being reclassified as destroyer escorts on 25 January 1943 and taken over by the United States Navy.

When the United States entered the war, and found they also required an antisubmarine warfare ship and that the destroyer escort fitted their needs perfectly, a system of rationing was put in place whereby out of every five destroyer escorts completed, four would be allocated to the U.S. Navy and one to the Royal Navy.

Post–World War II U.S. ship reclassification
After World War II, new-build United States Navy destroyer escorts were referred to as ocean escorts, but retained the hull classification symbol DE. However, other navies, most notably those of NATO countries and the USSR, followed different naming conventions for this type of ship, which resulted in some confusion. To remedy this problem, the 1975 ship reclassification declared ocean escorts (and by extension, destroyer escorts) as frigates (FF). This brought the USN's nomenclature more in line with NATO, and made comparing ship types with the Soviet Union easier. As of 2006, no plans existed for future frigates for the US Navy.  and the littoral combat ship (LCS) were the main ship types planned in this area. However, by 2017 the Navy had reversed course, and put out a Request For Proposals (RFP) for a new frigate class, temporarily designated FFG(X). One major problem with ship classification is whether to base it on a ship's role (such as escort or air defense), or on its size (such as displacement). One example of this ambiguity is the  air-defense ship class, which is classified as cruiser, though it uses the same hull as the s.

Vietnam War
During the Vietnam War, the Republic of Vietnam Navy received two s from the United States.

US Navy destroyer escort classes

World War II shipbuilding programs 

total ships in the table: 507DEs + 56APDs

37 Buckleys listed here as Buckleys were converted to APDs after having been commissioned as destroyer escorts. All APDs listed in the table were completed as conversions. Captains were converted before commissioning as DEs.

Data from "Ship's Data U.S. Naval Vessels"

hull numbers for WGT and FMR are still incomplete, price of $2,157 for Brown/WGT DE-423 is assumed to be a typo

other classes missing (work in progress)

From the same document, List of Naval Vessels, pp. 11:

Captain-class frigates of the Royal Navy

The Captain class was a designation given to 78 frigates of the Royal Navy, constructed in the United States, launched in 1942–1943 and delivered to the United Kingdom under the provisions of the Lend-Lease agreement (under which the United States supplied the United Kingdom and other Allied nations with materiel between 1941 and 1945), they were drawn from two subclasses of the destroyer escort (originally British destroyer escort) classification: 32 from the Evarts subclass and 46 from the Buckley subclass. Upon reaching the UK, the ships were substantially modified by the Royal Navy, including removal of torpedo tubes, making them distinct from the US Navy destroyer escort ships.

Captain-class frigates acted in the roles of convoy escorts, antisubmarine warfare vessels, coastal forces control frigates and headquarters ships for the Normandy landings. During the course of World War II, this class participated in the sinking of at least 34 German submarines and a number of other hostile craft with 15 of the 78 Captain-class frigates being either sunk or written off as a constructive total loss.

In the postwar period, all of the surviving Captain-class frigates except one (HMS Hotham) were returned to the US Navy before the end of 1947  to reduce the amount payable under the provisions of the Lend-Lease agreement; the last such frigate was returned to United States custody in March 1956.

Free French
Six Cannon-class destroyer escorts were built for the Free French Navy. Although initially transferred under the Lend-Lease Act, these ships were permanently transferred under the Mutual Defense Assistance Program (MDAP).

FFL Algérien (F-1),  ex-Cronin (DE-107)
FFL Sénégalais (F-2), ex-Corbestier (DE-106)
FFL Somali (F-3),  ex-Somali (DE-111)
FFL Hova (F-4),  ex-Hova (DE-110)
FFL Marocain (F-5),  ex-Marocain (DE-109)
FFL Tunisien (F-6),  ex-Crosley (DE-108)

Mutual Defense Assistance Program – Post WWII
Under the MDAP the destroyer escorts leased to the Free French were permanently transferred to the French Navy. In addition, the following navies also acquired DEs:

Republic of China Navy (Taiwan)
DE-47, DE-6

French Navy
DE-1007, DE-1008, DE-1009, DE-1010, DE-1011, DE-1012, DE-1013, DE-1016, DE-1017, DE-1018, DE1019

Hellenic Navy
 DE-173, DE-766, DE-768, DE-193

Italian Navy
DE-1020, DE-1031

Japanese Maritime Self-Defense Force
DE-168, DE-169

Philippine Navy
DE-168, DE-169, DE-170, DE-770, DE-771, DE-251, DE-637

Portuguese Navy
DE-509, DE-1032, DE-1039, DE-1042, DE-1046

Republic of Korea Navy
DE-770, DE-771

Royal Navy
DE-574

Royal Netherlands Navy
USS Burrows (DE-105), USS Rinehart (DE-196), USS Gustafson (DE-182), USS O'Neill (DE-188), USS Eisner (DE-192), USS Stern (DE-187)

Royal Thai Navy
DE-746

National Navy of Uruguay
DE-166, DE-189,

Comparison with contemporary frigates
The table below compares destroyer escorts and frigates designed for similar missions.

Surviving destroyer escorts 

Five destroyer escorts are preserved as museum ships, while others remain in active service.

 The   is preserved in Galveston, Texas.
 The   is preserved in Albany, New York.
 The  BNS Bauru (BE-4), formerly  is preserved in Rio de Janeiro, Brazil.
 The modified , ARC Cordoba (DT-15), formerly  is preserved in Tocancipa, Colombia. 
 The  , formerly , was recently decommissioned by the Philippine Navy and will be preserved as a museum ship at Sangley Point. 
 The  HTMS Pin Klao (DE-1), formerly , is active in the Royal Thai Navy as a training ship. She is the last operational World War II destroyer escort in any navy. 
 The Japanese Maritime Self-Defense Force operates six s.

See also
 The Enemy Below, a movie filmed on a DE
 List of destroyers of the Second World War
 List of escort vessel classes of the Second World War
 List of Escorteurs of the French Navy
 List of frigates
 List of Captain class frigates
 List of frigates of the Second World War
 List of frigates of the United States Navy subset of above with hull numbers DE/FF 1037 and higher plus all DEG/FFGs because of the United States Navy 1975 ship reclassification
 Naval tactics

Notes and references

Footnotes

Source notes

Bibliography

Online sources

Further reading
 On the subject of a particular example of this type of ship in World War II, the USS Abercrombie (DE-343), see Little Ship, Big War: The Saga of DE-343 by Edward Peary Stafford. Naval Institute Press (2000) 
 On the subject of the Captain-class frigate variant of the destroyer escort in World War II, see The Captain Class Frigates in the Second World War by Donald Collingwood. published by Leo Cooper (1998),

External links
 DESA – Destroyer Escort Sailors Association
 Destroyer Escort Historical Museum, Albany, NY
 Captains Class Frigates

Ship types